Pinder is the surname of the following people:

 Andrew Pinder, British corporate director
 Beverley Pinder, Australian executive
 Branden Pinder, American baseball player
 Bradley Pinder, Business Director & Professional Martial Artist
 Chad Pinder, American baseball player
 Charles Pinder, Anglican priest
 Cyril Pinder, American footballer
 Demetrius Pinder, Bahamian sprinter
 Enrique Pinder, Panamanian boxer
 George F. Pinder, American engineer
 George Pinder (cricketer), 19th-century English cricketer
 Gerry Pinder, Canadian ice hockey player
 Herb Pinder (ice hockey)
 Herb Pinder, Canadian politician
 Holm Pinder, German footballer
 Jack Pinder, English football player
 James K. Pinder, British-Canadian politician
 Jefferson Pinder, American artist
 John J. Pinder Jr. (1912–1944), U.S. soldier
 John Pinder (comedy producer), New Zealand-Australian
 John Pinder (RAF officer)
 John Pinder II, Bahamian politician
 Jordan Pinder, Canadian curler
 Julian T. Pinder, Canadian film director
 Keanu Pinder, Australian-Bahamian basketball player
 Leslie Hall Pinder, Canadian lawyer and poet
 Lucy Pinder, British glamour model and actress 
 Mike Pinder (born 1941), English musician
 Nelson Pinder, Florida activist 
 Patrick Pinder, Catholic archbishop of Nassau, Bahamas
 Philip Pinder, Bahamian boxer
 Powis Pinder (1872–1941), English actor and singer 
 Ralph Pinder-Wilson, British art historian
 Robert Mitford Pinder, Canadian politician
 Ryan Pinder, Bahamian politician
 Sam Pinder, New Zealand-Scottish rugby player
 Steven Pinder, British actor
 Tiny Pinder (born 1956), Bahamian basketballer
 Troy Pinder, Bahamian footballer

de:Pinder
mr:पिंडर